Marcello Lambrughi (born September 14, 1978 in Desio) is a retired Italian professional football player.

External links
 

1978 births
Living people
Italian footballers
Italy youth international footballers
S.S.D. Pro Sesto players
Treviso F.B.C. 1993 players
Giulianova Calcio players
U.S. Sassuolo Calcio players
A.S. Pizzighettone players
Association football defenders